The Offspring is an American rock band from Garden Grove, California, formed in 1984. Originally formed under the name Manic Subsidal, the band's current lineup consists of lead vocalist and rhythm guitarist Bryan "Dexter" Holland, lead guitarist Kevin "Noodles" Wasserman and bassist Todd Morse. Over the course of their -year career, the Offspring has released ten studio albums and have also experienced a number of lineup changes, most notably with their drummer. Their longest-serving drummer was Ron Welty, who replaced original drummer James Lilja in 1987 and stayed with the Offspring for 16 years. Welty was replaced by Atom Willard in 2003, who was replaced four years later by Pete Parada, who remained as the drummer for the Offspring until he was fired from the band in 2021 for refusing to get vaccinated against COVID-19. Gregory "Greg K." Kriesel (one of the Offspring's co-founders) was their bassist until 2018, when he was fired from the band due to business disputes, thus leaving Holland as the sole remaining original member. Kriesel was replaced by Todd Morse of H2O, who had been the Offspring's touring guitarist since 2009.

The Offspring is often credited—alongside fellow California punk bands Green Day, NOFX, Bad Religion and Rancid—for reviving mainstream interest in punk rock in the 1990s. They have sold over 40 million records worldwide, making them one of the best-selling punk rock bands in history.

After achieving a local following with their early releases, including their 1989 self-titled debut album and the vinyl-only EP Baghdad (1991), the Offspring signed with independent label Epitaph Records and released two albums: Ignition (1992) and Smash (1994). Smash, which contained the band's first major hit "Come Out and Play", propelled punk rock into the mainstream and holds the distinction as one of the best-selling albums released on an independent record label, selling over 11 million copies worldwide. The success of Smash attracted attention from major labels including Columbia Records, with whom The Offspring signed in 1996; their first album for the label, Ixnay on the Hombre (1997), did not match its predecessor’s success, but received favorable reviews and gold and platinum RIAA certifications. The band's fifth album Americana (1998) regained their previous level of popularity, obtaining support from MTV and radio and selling over five million units in the US. The Offspring has since released five more albums: Conspiracy of One (2000); Splinter (2003); Rise and Fall, Rage and Grace (2008); Days Go By (2012); and Let the Bad Times Roll (2021).

History

Early years (1983–1987)
 
The foundations for the Offspring began with guitarist/vocalist Bryan "Dexter" Holland (who was a drummer at the time) and bassist Greg Kriesel playing music together in a garage in Cypress, California in 1983. After hearing the T.S.O.L. album Change Today? at a party and following a riot at a 1984 Social Distortion show, they decided to form a band called Manic Subsidal. Holland changed his role from drums to guitar, and the band was rounded out by singer Doug Thompson and drummer Jim Benton. Marcus Parrish briefly joined as a second guitarist; however, no recordings were made at this point.

After Thompson was forced out, Holland took over vocals and Benton was replaced by Clowns of Death drummer James Lilja. In 1985, school janitor Kevin "Noodles" Wasserman (also formerly of Clowns of Death) joined as a second guitarist, allegedly because he was old enough to purchase alcohol for the other members, who were under the legal drinking age.

In 1986, after changing their name to the Offspring (after a B-movie called The Offspring: They Were Born to Kill), the band released their first single; the 7" "I'll Be Waiting". They released the single on their self-made Black Label record company, named after the brand of beer. An earlier version of "I'll Be Waiting" (then known as "Fire and Ice") appeared on the long-out of print Subject to Blackout compilation tape released the same year. The Offspring also recorded a demo tape in 1986, which received a positive review in Maximum Rocknroll magazine. Lilja left the Offspring in 1987 to pursue a medical career in oncology and was replaced by Ron Welty, who was 16 years old at the time.

The Offspring and Ignition (1988–1993)
After recording another demo in 1988, the Offspring signed a record deal with small-time label Nemesis Records. In March 1989, the band teamed up with producer Thom Wilson (who had worked with the Adolescents, Dead Kennedys, Social Distortion, the Vandals, and Youth Brigade) to record their first album, titled The Offspring. Nemesis released the album in limited numbers  and only on the 12" vinyl and cassette formats; the album was not released on CD until 1995. A six-week national tour followed, but Noodles was later stabbed during a performance at a Hollywood anti-nuclear benefit.

In 1991, the Offspring teamed up with Wilson again to produce the Baghdad 7" EP and a third demo tape. This EP and demo were instrumental to the band's signing with Epitaph Records. In 1992, Thom Wilson and the Offspring returned to the studio to record their second album Ignition, which was released in October of that year. The band went on U.S. tours with Pennywise and Lunachicks, and a European tour with NOFX.

Mainstream success with Smash (1994–1995)
When the Offspring returned to the studio in January 1994 to record their third album, the band's relations with producer Thom Wilson had begun to strain. Three months later, the Offspring released what would become their biggest selling album, titled Smash. The album was initially released to little mainstream attention until its lead single "Come Out and Play" received airplay from the Los Angeles radio station KROQ-FM, helping to raise the band's profile and eventually hitting number one on the Billboard rock charts for two weeks in the summer of 1994.

The success of "Come Out and Play" not only propelled Smash to peak at number four on the Billboard 200 and receive simultaneous gold and platinum certification four months after its release, but it also helped bring punk rock into the mainstream and is often considered a groundbreaking album for the pop-punk genre. The album's next two singles, "Self Esteem" and "Gotta Get Away", also had similar success to "Come Out and Play" in both chart performance and radio airplay. Smash has continued to sell consistently well in the years since its release, setting an all-time record for most units sold by an independent label band at over 11 million records and having sold over six million copies in the U.S. by 2000. The album also sold very well outside of the U.S., particularly in Australia, where it debuted No. 1 on the ARIA Charts, and remained in that position for three weeks in 1995.

The Offspring toured extensively throughout 1994 and 1995 in support of Smash. In addition to opening for bands like Pennywise, Bad Religion, and SNFU, the band had already graduated to headliner status by the summer of 1994, when they toured North America with Guttermouth and Big Drill Car; toured Europe with Desaster Area, and then toured the US in the fall with Rancid.

Touring for Smash continued throughout the first half of 1995, playing their first shows in Japan and Australia (including appearances at Big Day Out) and headlining tour dates with bands like Weezer, Quicksand, No Use for a Name, The Vandals, and Lunachicks. By the end of the album's supporting tour, the Offspring had started playing at larger venues such as theaters and arenas as opposed to the clubs and smaller venues they were previously accustomed to.

That same year (1995) the band decided to buy out the rights to their first album. Holland and Kriesel had created their own record label Nitro Records and started signing bands. One of their first releases was a re-release of the band's 1989 debut album, The Offspring. The label also signed a number of punk bands including the Vandals, Guttermouth, Jughead's Revenge, and AFI. Soon after, Nitro Records became solely Holland's responsibility.

Ixnay on the Hombre, Americana, and Conspiracy of One (1996–2002)

In 1996, after the success of Smash, the Offspring left Epitaph and signed with Columbia Records. Epitaph retained its rights to release the next album in Europe, while Columbia had it for all other territories. The band's attorney Peter Paterno had issued a letter to Epitaph stating that the band had "substantial and fundamental reasons" for wanting to leave the label and that Epitaph had "breached its contract".

The band began writing and recording their fourth album, titled Ixnay on the Hombre, in 1996. The album was released on February 4, 1997, which was also Noodles' 34th birthday. This album was not as successful as Smash, although it did sell four million units and spawned five singles. The album saw the band move away from the political-punk themes common to many Epitaph bands and more into mainstream rock with songs like "Gone Away" and "I Choose". The video for the last track was directed by Holland himself. Dexter commented that Ixnay was probably not as well received as Smash because it was such a departure, and that many fans probably were expecting Smash Part Two.

In 1998 the Offspring released Americana. Three of the album's singles, "Pretty Fly (for a White Guy)"; "Why Don't You Get a Job?"; and "The Kids Aren't Alright", became the band's biggest hits and made the album the peak of the Offspring's mainstream popularity. The former song topped the charts in nine countries including Australia, Japan, Norway, and the United Kingdom. "She's Got Issues" was also released as a single and was a minor hit.

In 1999, the band appeared as themselves in the film Idle Hands. They played a cover version of "I Wanna Be Sedated" (originally by the Ramones) and "Beheaded" at a school dance before Holland's character is killed. They also appeared at the infamous Woodstock 1999, where their performance was broadcast live on pay-per-view television.

2000 saw the band release their sixth album, Conspiracy of One. The band intended to release the entire album online through their official website to show their support for downloading music on the internet. However, under threat of legal action by Columbia through their parent company Sony, only the first single "Original Prankster" was released on their official website (the rest of the record was leaked to fan sites). The band also sold T-shirts on their website with the Napster logo on it and donated money to Napster creator Shawn Fanning with the profits.

The band also released a single "Defy You" exclusively for the film Orange County.

Ron Welty's departure, Splinter and Greatest Hits (2003–2005)
Longtime drummer Ron Welty left the group in 2003 to play in Steady Ground, a band in which he played drums and co-produced (they broke up in 2007). Neither Welty nor the remaining members have elaborated on the departure. It was later revealed that Welty was fired by Holland and Noodles "without any prior notice". He filed a lawsuit against the band in September 2020 for unpaid royalties.

In 2003, the band released their seventh album Splinter. the Offspring recruited Josh Freese to record the drums for Splinter and later announced that ex-Rocket from the Crypt drummer Atom Willard would be the official replacement for Ron Welty. The album's original title was to be Chinese Democrazy (You Snooze, You Lose), from the name of the long-delayed album by Guns N' Roses. As a result, Guns N' Roses frontman Axl Rose filed a cease and desist order against the Offspring, but then realized this was announced on April 1st. The first single "Hit That" enjoyed moderate success on MTV. "Hit That" used a variety of electronic samples, different from what the Offspring has done in the past.

In 2005, the band released a Greatest Hits album in both DualDisc and regular CD editions. Greatest Hits contains 14 of the band's hits between Smash and Splinter, and two previously unreleased songs, "Can't Repeat" and "Next to You" (a cover of the Police available as a hidden track). The compilation does not include any songs from the band's first two albums. The DualDisc contains video of Dexter and Noodles discussing the band's history and a bonus acoustic version of the song "Dirty Magic". About a month later, the band released a video DVD with all of their music videos and some videos from a live show.

During the summer of 2005, the band played the Vans Warped Tour for the first time and followed that with a European and Japanese tour. After the "Greatest Hits" world tour, the band took a break from writing, recording, and touring. During the hiatus, Willard was recruited by Tom DeLonge for his band Angels & Airwaves and released an album, We Don't Need to Whisper, in 2006.

Rise and Fall, Rage and Grace (2006–2009)

In November 2006, it was reported that the Offspring were back in the studio recording their eighth studio album Rise and Fall, Rage and Grace with producer Bob Rock and "a fistful of demos". In July 2007, Dexter announced that the band had finished two more songs and the album was being recorded in Orange County, California.

It was announced on July 27, 2007, that former Saves the Day drummer Pete Parada had been chosen to be the Offspring's new drummer, replacing Atom Willard, who went on to join Angels and Airwaves. The band's first shows with Parada were at the Summer Sonic festival in Japan in August 2007. It was during these shows that the band debuted "Hammerhead", which would become the first single from the new album. Parada did not play on the new album however; Josh Freese once again handled drum duties as he did with Splinter.

The Offspring co-headlined the Australian Soundwave Festival during February and May 2008 alongside Incubus and Killswitch Engage.

On April 9, 2008, Dexter announced that the album would be called Rise and Fall, Rage and Grace and would be released on June 17. The album's first single, "Hammerhead", went to radio on May 6. Additionally, the Offspring's official site provided an MP3 download of the song to the general public on May 5. The second single from the album, "You're Gonna Go Far, Kid", had topped the Hot Modern Rock Tracks chart and stayed there for 11 weeks, a record for the band. It was also the Offspring's only RIAA Gold song, proving it to be one of the most successful singles the band had released in their over 20-year career. Despite this, Rise and Fall, Rage and Grace has never received any RIAA certifications.

Also in April 2008, Epitaph Records announced that the label would be reissuing Ignition and Smash; both albums were remastered and Smash contained a new 24-page booklet. The reissues were released on the same day as Rise and Fall, Rage and Grace, coinciding with the new album's release.

The supporting tour for the album began on May 16 with a performance at the X-Fest festival in California. On May 28, it was announced on the band's website that Scott Shiflett (from Face to Face) would replace bassist Greg K. on current tour dates due to a birth in the family. Kriesel returned in mid-June. In October, with the addition of touring guitarist Andrew Freeman, the band embarked on a three-week Japanese tour followed by a South American tour.

On December 13, 2008, the Offspring headlined the nineteenth annual KROQ Almost Acoustic Christmas. In an interview at the Almost Acoustic Christmas show, guitarist Noodles stated that the Offspring would be taking a break for a month or two and promised a US tour to kick off in 2009. They toured North America on their "Shit is Fucked Up" tour from May through July with Dropkick Murphys, Alkaline Trio, Street Dogs, Pennywise, Shiny Toy Guns, Sum 41, and Frank Turner.

Days Go By (2010–2013)
In May 2009, the band started doing preliminary work with Bob Rock in Hawaii for what would be the ninth Offspring album. They recorded sporadically throughout the next year. In June 2010 the Offspring headlined two dates in Western Canada. The Offspring took a break from the studio in order to join 311 on their summer 2010 Unity Tour. The 19-date tour was held in amphitheaters around the U.S. and also featured Pepper as a special guest. Before the 311 and Pepper tour, the Offspring played four West Coast dates in June, which were supported by Terrible Things. In January 2011, session drummer Josh Freese (who recorded drum tracks for the band's last two albums) mentioned on his website that he was in the studio working with the Offspring again. Ronnie King had also confirmed that he would appear as the album’s keyboardist after performing the same role on Splinter. The band interrupted their work in 2011 in order to tour and took the main stage at the 2011 Reading and Leeds Festivals.

After the tour, the band started recording in earnest and it was later announced that the album was in the mixing stage. They headlined the PunkSpring Festival in Japan on March 31, 2012 in Tokyo and on April 1, 2012 in Osaka with Sum 41, New Found Glory, and All Time Low. At one of the shows, the Offspring performed a new song called "The Future Is Now". They were also confirmed to play at the Rock am Ring/im Park and Novarock festivals in the summer 2012. Prior to that, the band would be playing at the 20th annual KROQ Weenie Roast, which was to take place at the Verizon Wireless Amphitheatre in Irvine, California on May 5, 2012.

In March 2012, the band announced on their Twitter page that the album was finished. On April 20, 2012, Kevin and Bean announced that the Offspring's new single "Days Go By" would be premiered on April 27. Three days later, the band announced on their website that Days Go By would be the name of their ninth studio album, which was eventually released on June 26, 2012. On April 30, 2012, the band released another song from Days Go By, "Cruising California (Bumpin' in My Trunk)".

In early fall 2012, the Offspring toured with Neon Trees and Dead Sara. They were co-headliners of the Soundwave in Australia in 2013 alongside Metallica and Linkin Park. After this, they performed at the 20th annual WJRR Earthday Birthday on April 13, 2013, and at the Gulfport Music Festival a month later. The Offspring spent much of the spring, summer, and fall of 2013 playing shows in Europe, the United States, and South America. In November and December 2013, they played the Warped Tour for the first time in eight years, this time in Australia.

On June 20, 2013, it was reported that the Offspring was working on a live album with engineer Ian Charbonneau. Instead of a standard release, the live album (which was recorded in Warsaw, Poland at the Orange Warsaw Festival held at Narodowy Stadium) would have had been released online but to date has not come to fruition.

Touring and Round Hill Music (2014–2016)
The Offspring spent the summer of 2014 on tour commemorating the 20th anniversary of their third album Smash. They headlined the Summer Nationals 2014 tour from July to September with support from their former labelmates Bad Religion and Pennywise as well as the Vandals, Stiff Little Fingers, and Naked Raygun. To coincide with the Summer Nationals tour, the Offspring released cover versions of Pennywise's "No Reason Why" and Bad Religion's "Do What You Want" and "No Control" on their YouTube account. These cover versions were released on the EP Summer Nationals, which was released digitally in August 2014. On December 24, 2014, Radio Contraband announced on their Facebook page that they would premiere the Offspring's new single, "Coming for You", on January 30, 2015. The Offspring toured in support of the "Coming for You" single and performed their 1998 album Americana in its entirety at the Amnesia Rockfest on June 19, 2015, in Montebello, Canada.

The Offspring reclaimed the rights to their Columbia Records albums in 2014. The band started auctioning off the rights to those albums in August 2015 (as well as their songwriting credits) for around $30 million. Sony Music Entertainment (the owner of Columbia Records) and Round Hill Music were allegedly interested in bidding for the Offspring's music. In January 2016, Round Hill acquired the band's Columbia Records catalogue and their career-long music publishing rights for $35 million. In December 2016, Round Hill signed a distribution deal with Universal Music Enterprises for the Offspring's Columbia catalog (including the Greatest Hits album). By September 2015, the band had finished two to three tracks. On July 20, 2016, a new Offspring song "Sharknado"  premiered, which was recorded for the film Sharknado: The 4th Awakens.

Let the Bad Times Roll and split with Greg K and Pete Parada (2017–2021)
Bassist Greg K. mentioned a possible 2018 release date for the new Offspring album, and revealed that one of the reasons for the album's slow progress was because they have been working on songs here and there. He also stated that the band was in no hurry to finish it. Noodles was absent from the Offspring's summer 2017 tour with Sublime with Rome due to a "sudden family matter"; filling in for him on dates were Tom Thacker and Jonah Nimoy. That year, Holland earned PhD in molecular biology from the University of Southern California.

On December 13, 2017, the Offspring posted Twitter and Instagram photos of their December calendar, with the second and third week of the month labeled "studio", and wrote, "Who's ready for new music in 2018?". In the same month, Noodles told Front Row Live, "We're working on it. We were in the studio all this week. We finished up for the holidays on Tuesday, Wednesday, and then we're gonna get back in the studio as soon as the new year [rolls around], in January." On February 23, 2018, the band announced via Instagram that they had finished tracking down drums for the album. The Offspring were later asked on Twitter if their new album would be released soon and replied, "We're hoping by summer." On June 9, 2018, the Offspring debuted one song that was expected to appear on the new album, "It Won't Get Better", while performing at the Greenfield Festival in Switzerland. On July 20, 2018, it was announced the Offspring would release a cover of 311's "Down" and 311 would release a "reggaefied" cover of the Offspring's "Self Esteem", which 311's lead singer Nick Hexum referred to as "probably [his] favorite song of theirs;" the cover versions coincided with the co-headlining Never Ending Summer tour.

On August 30, 2018, Noodles revealed to Music Feeds that the Offspring was working on two separate albums. He stated: "We have a whole record or more worth of stuff here — I think we're looking at making two records out of it — you know, like, splitting 'em up and coming out with a pretty straightforward punk and rock record that sounds like us, and then maybe saving some of the crazier stuff for another record." A few days later, he told WHIO-AM that the album will be released around the beginning of 2019, and added: "We don't have a record deal right now and we're trying to work something out. We don't know what we're going to do with that." Greg K. did not appear throughout the Offspring’s headline Australian and Japan tours in 2018 and was instead replaced by No Doubt bassist Tony Kanal.

On February 23, 2019, Noodles confirmed on his Instagram account that the new Offspring album is finished. He wrote, "The album is done. Working on getting it to the fans now. Stay tuned!" A month later, Dexter Holland confirmed that the album was "98% finished" and mentioned a tentative fall 2019 release. In August, Greg Kriesel filed a lawsuit against Holland and Noodles following an alleged decision by the two in November 2018 to ban Kriesel from the band's activities, including studio recordings and live performances. Kriesel and his lawyers also alleged that the two conspired to "seize the business, business opportunities, and assets" of Kriesel's stake in the band without compensation. Later, touring rhythm guitarist Todd Morse became a full-time member, replacing Kriesel as the new bassist.

Noodles reiterated that the new Offspring album was ready for release in 2020 and they are in the process of searching for a new record label to release it. On April 21, 2020 the band released a rock cover of Joe Exotic's country song "Here Kitty Kitty" popularized by the 2020 Netflix documentary Tiger King. It was recorded while the band was in quarantine during the COVID-19 pandemic. In a June 2020 interview with Download TV, Holland confirmed that the new album was "basically done" but added that its release was "on hold at the moment" because of the coronavirus pandemic.

On September 10, 2020, former drummer Ron Welty filed a lawsuit against the band for unpaid royalties.

On November 4, 2020, the Offspring released their first-ever Christmas song, a cover of Darlene Love's "Christmas (Baby Please Come Home)". A physical version of this song was released as a 7-inch vinyl single on December 11, 2020, and a description at the band's online store stated that "the single is also the tip of the iceberg for new music coming from the acclaimed group in early 2021".

On November 13, 2020, the band uploaded a lyric video for their song "Huck It!" and announced a vinyl re-release of Conspiracy of One in honor of its 20th anniversary.

On February 8, 2021, Dexter and Noodles posted a video confirming that the album was finished with an official release date and single announcement coming soon. On February 23, 2021, the Offspring announced that their tenth album would be titled Let the Bad Times Roll, and released the title track as its lead single through streaming services; the album was released on April 16.

On August 2, 2021, Parada announced he had been fired from the Offspring as he had declined to be vaccinated against COVID-19. He said he acted on the advice of his doctor, as he suffers from Guillain–Barré syndrome. In an interview published in November 2021, Holland and Wasserman denied that Parada had been fired and instead said they had been forced to hire other drummers "for the time being" for the safety of their crew on tour.In a March 4, 2023 interview, Parada confirmed that he was fired and is no longer a member of The Offspring and had formed a new band called The Defiant.

Upcoming eleventh studio album (2022–present)
In a September 2022 interview with Brazilian radio station 89FM A Rádio Rock, frontman Dexter Holland confirmed that the Offspring has begun working on new material for their eleventh studio album: "...[W]e wanna keep things rolling. We had to take time off in the pandemic and we feel like, 'We're back at it. Let's make the most of it right now.' So we're working on a new album." Holland told Times Colonist in November that the band would begin recording their new album in January 2023 with Bob Rock. The Offspring announced
on social media in March 2023 that they were "back in the studio."

Style and influences
The Offspring has been labeled primarily as punk rock, and punk subgenres including hardcore punk, melodic hardcore, pop-punk, and skate punk. They have also been labeled as alternative rock. A signature style of the Offspring are their chorused "whoas", "heys", or "yeahs". The band's former labelmates NOFX poked fun at them for this in their song "Whoa on the Whoas". Several tracks also incorporate elements of Eastern music, which can be heard on the likes of "Tehran", "Me & My Old Lady", "Pay the Man", "Dividing By Zero", and the verse hook from "Come Out and Play". Their lyrics cover a wide range of topics, like personal relationships, such as in their songs "She's Got Issues", "Self Esteem" and "Spare Me the Details", and the degradation of the United States, politics, and society in general with songs like "It'll Be a Long Time", "Americana" and "Stuff Is Messed Up". The lyrics generally reflect a sarcastic viewpoint, which, along with the language, can be offensive to some. This is acknowledged in the opening track from their album Ixnay on the Hombre, "Disclaimer", which is sarcastic itself. Like "Disclaimer", the first track of most of the Offspring's albums are an introduction of some sort; "Time to Relax" (from Smash), "Welcome" (from Americana), "Intro" (from Conspiracy of One), and "Neocon" (from Splinter) are also examples of this. The Offspring's influences include the Dickies, the Sex Pistols, the Misfits, T.S.O.L., Agent Orange, the Adolescents, the Ramones, the Clash, the Dead Kennedys and Suicidal Tendencies.

Impact and legacy
With the mainstream success of Smash, going six times multi-platinum and earning worldwide airplay, the Offspring's impact persists to this day. As one of the most popular punk bands of the 1990s, they are credited with reviving popular interest in punk rock and bringing the genre back into the mainstream, and have influenced younger artists such as Avril Lavigne and Simple Plan. The Los Angeles modern rock radio station KROQ listed the Offspring at No. 21 in "The KROQ Top 106.7 Artists of 1980–2008" Countdown by Year memorial, with 30 appearances on the station's year-end countdowns as of 2008.

The Offspring's music has appeared in movies, such as The Chase, Batman Forever, I Know What You Did Last Summer, The Faculty, Varsity Blues, Wanted, Idle Hands (which also features a cameo by the band), Me, Myself & Irene, Loser, Tomcats, Bubble Boy, The Animal, American Pie 2, Orange County, The New Guy, Bowling for Columbine, Pauly Shore Is Dead, Click, How to Eat Fried Worms (for the trailer), Sharknado: The 4th Awakens and Tekken: The Motion Picture. "Mota", "Amazed", "The Meaning of Life" (all from Ixnay on the Hombre) were featured in Warren Miller's 1997 documentary Snowriders II.

"Pretty Fly (for a White Guy)" can be heard in the King of the Hill episode "Escape From Party Island". "Original Prankster" was featured in The Cleveland Show episode "American Prankster". "You're Gonna Go Far, Kid" was featured in the 90210 episode We're Not in Kansas Anymore, while "Kristy, Are You Doing Okay?" appeared in the episode Zero Tolerance. In the Close Enough episode "The Weird Kid", a subplot concerned a character accidentally wishing to become obsessed with the Offspring; various references to their work can be heard throughout.

In video games, the Offspring's songs have appeared in Crazy Taxi, Tony Hawk's Pro Skater 4 and SingStar Rocks!. "Pretty Fly (for a White Guy)" appears in Guitar Hero: Van Halen. "Hammerhead", "Gone Away", "Pretty Fly (for a White Guy)", "Self Esteem", "All I Want", "The Kids Aren't Alright", "A Lot Like Me" and "Days Go By" are downloadables for the Rock Band series. "Hammerhead" was also featured in the football video game Madden NFL 09. "Days Go By" was featured in NHL 13. From September 20 to October 7, 2019, the band performed a virtual concert in World of Tanks, with a limited-edition tank. The tank has instruments (and skateboards) stacked on top of its hull, "Pretty fly" painted on the side armour, and band members acting as the crew.

"Pretty Fly (for a White Guy)" received a parody treatment by "Weird Al" Yankovic as "Pretty Fly for a Rabbi".

Band members

Musicians

Current members
 Dexter Holland – lead vocals ; rhythm and occasional lead guitar ; piano, keyboards and synthesizers ; lead guitar ; bass 
 Noodles – lead guitar, backing vocals 
 Todd Morse – bass , backing vocals ; rhythm guitar , lead guitar 

Current touring musicians
 Jonah Nimoy – rhythm guitar, keyboards, percussion, backing vocals 
 Josh Freese – drums, percussion 

Touring substitutes
 Scott Shiflett – bass 
 Tom Thacker – rhythm guitar, backing vocals 

Former members
 Greg K. – bass, backing vocals 
 Doug Thompson – lead vocals 
 Jim Benton – drums 
 James Lilja – drums, backing vocals 
 Marcus Parrish – lead guitar 
 Ron Welty – drums 
 Atom Willard – drums 
 Pete Parada - drums 

Touring members
 Chris "X-13" Higgins – rhythm guitar, keyboards, percussion, backing vocals 
 Ronnie King – keyboards, percussion 
 Warren Fitzgerald – rhythm guitar, backing vocals 
 Andrew Freeman – rhythm guitar, backing vocals 
 Tony Kanal – bass 
 Jamie Miller - drums 
 Phil Jordan - trumpet

Line-ups

Official member timeline

Touring musician timeline

Discography

Studio albums
 The Offspring (1989)
 Ignition (1992)
 Smash (1994)
 Ixnay on the Hombre (1997)
 Americana (1998)
 Conspiracy of One (2000)
 Splinter (2003)
 Rise and Fall, Rage and Grace (2008)
 Days Go By (2012)
 Let the Bad Times Roll (2021)

Awards
 List of awards and nominations received by the Offspring

References

Further viewing
 The Offspring: Complete Music Video Collection (2005)

External links

 

 
The Offspring's 'Smash': The Little Punk LP That Defeated the Majors  (Rolling Stone article)

 
Columbia Records artists
Epitaph Records artists
Alternative rock groups from California
1984 establishments in California
Kerrang! Awards winners
American musical trios
Huntington Beach, California
Musical groups established in 1984
Musical groups from Orange County, California
Musical quartets
Nitro Records artists
Time Bomb Recordings artists
Pop punk groups from California
Skate punk groups
MTV Europe Music Award winners
American punk rock groups